Baguette laonnaise, losange, dauphin or baguette Thiérache, is a variation of Maroilles cheese, a type of washed-rind cheese made from cow's milk. It originates from the region of Thiérache as well as the city of Laon, Picardie, France. The cheese has a 45% fat content, and is typically loaf-shaped and has a supple interior as well as a sticky orange-brown rind. It is matured in a humid cellar with salt water washing for three to four months. 

The name comes from its shape, a rectangular baguette roughly 15cm long, with a square section of 6cm on each side and a weight of 500g.

Origins 
Various origins can be found:

 one origin refers to a visit of the dauphin, son of Louis XIV. Due to is young age, monks presented a milder version of Maroilles cheese, by adding herbs and spices; 
 an other origin refers to a "royal act" setting the "Dauphin's Rights", signed by Charles VII of France. The cheese would have been created to render thanks to an exemption of right-of-way fee dispensed to Maroilles cheese transporters; 
 an other source sets a creation date circa 1930.

Manufacturing 
This cheese is a variation of Maroilles cheese, the only difference lies in the adjonction of Black pepper and Tarragon to the milk curd, before being placed in a mould. All the ingredients are then mixed and worked like Maroilles cheese.

Tip: Avoid placing this cheese in a fridge for too long as the rind may dry out and cause the taste to become sour and gives off unpleasant-bitter aftertaste.

References

External links 
Cheese.com article
article

Cow's-milk cheeses
French cheeses
Picardy cuisine
Washed-rind cheeses